Entertainment Live (also known as E-Live) is a Philippine showbiz oriented talk show broadcast by ABS-CBN airing every Saturday afternoon after the defunct noontime show Happy Yipee Yehey!. The show premiered August 4, 2007, replacing Entertainment Konek and was first hosted by the Pinoy Big Brother hosts, Toni Gonzaga, Mariel Rodriguez, and Bianca Gonzales. In 2008, Luis Manzano was added as a co-host of the show. Due to Kris Aquino's absence in her talk shows in 2010, Gonzaga replaced her in The Buzz while Gonzalez replaced her in SNN. In 2010, the new co-hosts were revealed as Cesca Litton and Nikki Gil replacing them. After SNN ended airing, Gonzalez returned hosting E-Live. The show officially ended on January 28, 2012, and it was replaced by Showbiz Inside Report.

Cast

Main Hosts
 Bianca Gonzalez (2007–2010, 2011–2012)
 Luis Manzano (2008–2012)
 Nikki Gil (2010–2012)
 Ogie Diaz (2010–2012)

Guest Hosts
 Bianca Manalo (2011)
 Ginger Conejero (2011)
 Gretchen Fullido (2011)
 Angelica Panganiban (2011)
 Valerie Concepcion (2011)
 Vilma Santos (2011)

Former Hosts
 Toni Gonzaga (2007–2010; transferred to The Buzz)
 Mariel Rodriguez (2007–2010)
 Cesca Litton (2010)
 K Brosas (2011)

Segments

OMG!
Hosted by the all host of Entertainment Live, this segment let the hosts of the show give their reactions, opinions and points of view.

Eguess mo
Hosted by Ogie Diaz for his blind item.

SixRets
Six questions to be asked on a guest by Luis Manzano

E-Live Inbox
The hosts reads the comments posted by the fans and televiewers.

Super Fans Day
Nikki Gil with a celebrity goes to a school and have a special and super cool fans day.

Awards
 2008, 2009, 2010 & 2011 PMPC Star Awards for TV "Best Showbiz-Oriented Talk Show" (Nominated)
 Toni Gonzaga won for "Best Female Showbiz-Oriented Talk Show Host" in 2009 PMPC Star Awards for TV.
 Bianca Gonzalez won for "Best Female Showbiz-Oriented Talk Show Host" in 2010 PMPC Star Awards for TV.
 Luis Manzano won for "Best Male Showbiz-Oriented Talk Show Host" in 2011 PMPC Star Awards for TV.

Cancellation 
E-live will air its final episode on January 28, 2012. Only Ogie Diaz will retain for the new talk show Showbiz Inside Report which set to premiere on February 4, 2012, along with Carmina Villaroel, Janice de Belen and Joey Marquez. Luis Manzano will focus on handling some shows including the hit game show Kapamilya, Deal or No Deal Season 4, Myx & Sarah G. Live, Bianca Gonzales hosting on another showbiz news Cinema News on Cinema One (An ABS-CBN Filipino Cable Movie Channel), Pinoy Big Brother: Unlimited, and join Umagang Kay Ganda while Nikki Gil will focus acting for Mundo Man ay Magunaw and handling both  ASAP 2012 and Myx.

See also
 List of programs broadcast by ABS-CBN

References

External links
Official website

ABS-CBN original programming
Entertainment news shows in the Philippines
2007 Philippine television series debuts
2012 Philippine television series endings
Filipino-language television shows